Per Collinder (22 May 1890  – 6 December 1975) was a Swedish astronomer. 

Born at Sundsvall, he is known for a catalog of open clusters that he published in 1931, which is today known as the Collinder catalogue. He has written the books History of navigation and Worlds in Orbit.

He was married twice, and his first wife gave him four children. Collinder died at Uppsala.

Notes and references

1890 births
1974 deaths
People from Sundsvall
20th-century Swedish astronomers